Gualala Point Regional Park is a regional park on Gualala Point at the mouth of the Gualala River in Sonoma County, California, south of Gualala.  The  park is maintained by the Sonoma County Regional Parks Department.

The park features a visitors center, picnic area, beach access, and views of the Pacific Ocean. It also offers redwood campsites, hiking, seasonal fishing in the Gualala River, and day use parking. Its restrooms have flush toilets, and the campground restrooms include showers and electrical outlets.

The visitors center includes informational displays on Native Americans, early California history, and the logging industry of circa 1900.

Gualala Regional Point Park offers  of coastal trails and Gualala Point Beach is ADA accessible via a paved path. The Gualala Point Regional Park campground is located on the Eastern side of Hwy 1 and is connected to the day use area by a short forested trail.

See also
 List of beaches in Sonoma County, California
 List of Sonoma County Regional Parks facilities
 List of California state parks

References

External links
 
 
 Panoramic Video of Gualala Point Regional Park

Parks in Sonoma County, California
Regional parks in California
Beaches of Sonoma County, California